Theodor Franz, Count of Baillet von Latour (15 June 17806 October 1848) was an Austrian soldier and statesman. As the Imperial Minister of War, he was killed by a mob at the beginning of the Vienna Uprising.

Biography
Latour was born at Linz the son of Count Maximilian Anton Karl Baillet de Latour (17371806), a Feldmarschall-Leutnant in Austrian service during the Revolutionary Wars of Walloon descent. After a military and engineering training at the Theresian Military Academy, he entered the corps of engineers in 1799 and became a member of the general staff of the Austrian Imperial and Royal Army in 1804. Latour took part in various military campaigns of the Napoleonic Wars in which he distinguished himself and was highly decorated.

During European Restoration he filled an array of leadership roles in the military ranks up to a Feldzeugmeister, and in addition served as the head of the military commission attached to the Bundesversammlung (assembly) of the German Confederation at Frankfurt, contributed to the design of the fortifications at Rastatt, and finally was director of engineering.

In the Revolutions of 1848 he was called to head the war ministry in the cabinet of Minister-President Count Karl Ludwig von Ficquelmont, whose direction he saw to without regard to his advanced years. A distinct asserter of conservatism, his efforts especially sought to give the public no cause for unrest. Faced with the Hungarian Revolution, Latour backed the loyal forces of Ban Josip Jelačić and arranged troops to second his campaign. These efforts sparked the Vienna Uprising: On 6 October 1848 a crowd of students, workers and mutinous soldiers forcibly tried to prevent the troops marching off. In the following street fights, an outraged mob sought Latour out in the war ministry and lynched him.

References 
 “Latour, Theodor Franz, Graf Baillet von” in Allgemeine Deutsche Biographie, Band 18 (Leipzig, 1883), S. 16–17. 
 Carl Schurz, Reminiscences (3 volumes), New York: The McClure Company, 1907.  In Chapter VI of Volume I, Schurz recalls Latour's assassination: “minister of war, Count Latour, was hanged to a lamp-post by an infuriated crowd.”

1780 births
1848 deaths
19th-century Austrian people
Austrian soldiers
People of the Revolutions of 1848
Counts of Baillet-Latour
Assassinated Austrian politicians
Austrian Empire commanders of the Napoleonic Wars
Knights Cross of the Military Order of Maria Theresa
Politicians from Linz
Military personnel from Linz